Mon Sheong Foundation Chinese School is a fee-operated private school, with focus on promoting Chinese culture, heritage, and philosophy. 

The MSFCS was created in 1968 by the Mon Sheong Foundation in Toronto and uses Cantonese/Putonghua as the language of instruction.

Today MSFCS offers additional programs including:

 Chinese (Cantonese) Program for children over the age of 3
 Chinese (Putonghua) Program for children over the age of 3
 Conversational Putonghua Program 
 Mathematics Program for grades 1 to 12 

Programs run on Friday evenings and Saturdays from September to May.

Instructors are mainly college graduates from Hong Kong, China and Canada.

Facilities

The MSFCS does not have permanent facilities and obtains leases from York Region District School Board and Toronto District School Board for its after-school or weekend programs.

 Etobicoke Campus: Dixon Grove Middle School
 Markham Campus: Pierre Elliott Trudeau High School
 North York Campus: Earl Haig Secondary School
 Richmond Hill Campus: H.G. Bernard Public School

Previous locations:

 Scarborough Campus: W.A. Porter Collegiate Institute (Scarborough Board of Education)

Scholarships

 Dr. Sim Fai Liu Awards for Outstanding Achievement
 Mandarin Scholarships
 Ming Shau Yau Scholarships
 Ping Shao Quan Awards for Academic Achievement
 Leon & Susan Foon-Chim Endowment Fund Scholarships

Alumni and Notable Faculty

 Dr. Sim Fai Liu (1919–1999) MD, OOnt - co-founder Mon Sheong Foundation Chinese School; resident at Toronto Western Hospital and medical director at Lambert Lodge and Castleview-Wychwood Towers
 Ping Shao Quan - former Chair and Chinese School Principal
 Helena Zhang - Principal, Etobicoke Campus
 Paul Chan - Principal, Markham Campus
 Alain Tan - Principal, North York Campus
 Jephunneh Cheng - Principal, Richmond Hill Campus

References
 Mon Sheong Chinese School Website

Private schools in Toronto